Vinusha Devi (born 5 December 1984) is an Indian actress and model who predominantly appears in Tamil soap opera. She is known for her lead role in Tamil TV series Bharathi Kannamma.

Early life
Vinusha was born on 5 December 1998 in Chennai. After finishing her graduation, she started her career in modeling and acting.

Career
In 2021, while pursuing her career in modeling she got an opportunity to act in a Tamil film titled N4. Vinusha played an important role in the film. Later in November 2021, she replaced Roshini Haripriyan for her role of Kannamma in popular television series Bharathi Kannamma. This marked Vinusha's television debut in a lead role.

Filmography

Films

Television

Awards and accolades

References

External links 

Living people
1998 births
Actresses in Tamil cinema
Actresses in Tamil television